Daniel Steven Shelley (born 28 December 1990) is an English footballer who plays for Leek Town in the Northern Premier League after being released by Crewe Alexandra. Having been at the club since the age of 14, he made his full debut for the club in December 2008 and scored his first career goal in the FA Cup against Millwall. He was released along with three other first team members on 1 June 2012. After a number of unsuccessful trials he signed on non-contract terms with Leek Town in September 2012.

References

External links
Danny Shelley player profile at crewealex.net

1990 births
Living people
People from Endon
English footballers
Association football midfielders
Crewe Alexandra F.C. players
Leek Town F.C. players
English Football League players
Northern Premier League players